Kortright is a surname. and may refer to:

Anne Marie Kortright, Puerto Rican fashion model
Charles Kortright (1871–1952), English cricketer
 Cornelius Hendricksen Kortright (1817–1897), British civil servant, Governor of British Guiana.
 Elizabeth Kortright, married name Elizabeth Monroe (1768–1830), First Lady of the United States from 1817 to 1825, as the wife of James Monroe
 Frances Kortright (1821–1900), British writer and anti-suffragist

See also
 Kortright, New York